KDIC (88.5 FM) was a non-commercial radio station located in Grinnell, Iowa, United States, the station was licensed to Grinnell College Trustees of Iowa. Live streaming was available through kdic.grinnell.edu and through the KDIC smartphone apps for iOS and Android.

Programming
KDIC had a one- to two-hour block format from 5PM-1AM every day. The DJs were mostly students as well as some members of the Grinnell community.
A select number of shows were podcasted and available at kdic.grinnell.edu.

History
On December 6, 1948, KGRW began broadcasting as Grinnell College's first radio station. It broadcast popular and classical music, news, and interviews. In 1961, students appealed for funding to upgrade the station equipment, but the request was turned down, and the station closed until spring 1968, when it was reopened as KDIC.

KDIC went on the air on May 20, 1968 on 88.9 MHz using a 10-watt FM transmitter located on the second floor of Darby Gym. During the first year, eighty-five students provided enough staffing to allow for 121 hours a week of programming.

In 1971, after experiencing increasing interference on 88.9 MHz, the FCC approved the frequency change to 88.5 MHz. In 1984, transmitter power was increased to 130 watts.

The licensee failed to file for license renewal by October 1, 2004 and the station's license expired on February 1, 2005. The FCC approved a Special Temporary Authorization (STA) on October 18, 2005 and the station resumed operation, ceasing again on May 12, 2006 in anticipation of the end of the academic year. The FCC granted a second STA on September 22, 2006 and on January 31, 2007 approved the renewal of the KDIC license.

The FCC cancelled KDIC's license again effective July 15, 2022, as the station had been silent since August 31, 2020.

Railroad track antenna legend
According to campus legend, between the 1950s and 1970s, KGRW committed an FCC violation and was removed from the air for a year after station DJ's illegally connected the radio transmitter to metal train tracks on campus, supposedly creating a transmission radius that was hundreds or possibly thousands of miles. According to FCC records, no such violation has ever been documented.

References

External links

Grinnell College
DIC
Radio stations established in 1968
1968 establishments in Iowa
Radio stations disestablished in 2022
2022 disestablishments in Iowa
Defunct radio stations in the United States
Defunct mass media in Iowa